The Coast Guard Bears football program is a college football team that represents United States Coast Guard Academy in the New England Football Conference, a part of the NCAA Division III.  The team has had 15 head coaches since its first recorded football game in 1922, including hall of fame member Otto Graham The current coach is Bill George who first took the position for the 1999 season.

Key

Coaches
Statistics correct as of the end of the 2022 college football season.

Notes

References

Lists of college football head coaches

Connecticut sports-related lists